San Diego Derby United is a roller derby organization based in San Diego, California.

In 2005, Bonnie D. Stroir founded the program, then named the San Diego Derby Dolls, in a Linda Vista roller rink, Skateworld. The early years of the program were spent learning the game and fundraising for the program's first banked track..

San Diego Derby United's two-acre facility in the Encanto neighborhood of San Diego features both banked and flat regulation roller derby tracks.

History
The league was founded by Bonnie D.Stroir, who lived in San Diego, but had been skating with LADD for two years.  Around late 2006, the Dolls installed a banked track, but also continue to compete on a flat track, becoming the first "hybrid" league.

By 2009, the Dolls had about 80 skaters and nearly 1,000 fans. San Diego won the 2009 and 2010 editions of Battle on the Bank, the national banked track roller derby championship and came in 3rd place in the 2011 Battle on the Bank. In 2010, they were ranked 20th in the world in flat-track derby. In March 2011, they took on WFTDA Championship winners the Rocky Mountain Rollergirls on the Dolls' banked track, losing 100-125 to the flat track league.

San Diego was a founding member of the Roller Derby Coalition of Leagues in January 2012.

In December 2015, the San Diego Derby Dolls announced they had teamed up with local WFTDA roller derby league SoCal Derby to make the first coalition between a banked and flat track league under one roof in modern roller derby. In 2018, the program went on to expand their offerings, bringing in the MRDA program, the San Diego Aftershocks. In 2019, they brought in the JRDA team, San Diego Tremors.

In media and culture

The San Diego Derby Dolls were the inspiration for the 2013 play Derbywise by Circle Circle dot dot.

In 2015, the San Diego Derby Dolls and General Manager, Isabelle Ringer, were highlighted on Mike Rowe's CNN Program 'Somebody's Gotta Do It' in episode entitled 'Derby Dolls.'

References

Roller derby leagues in California
Derby Dolls
Roller derby leagues established in 2005
Roller Derby Coalition of Leagues
2005 establishments in California